Prince Philip Hospital is a district general hospital in Llanelli, Wales. It is managed by Hywel Dda University Health Board.

History
The hospital, which was designed by Holder Mathias, was built in the late 1980s and was completed in May 1990. The hospital expanded when a new breast care unit opened in October 2010.

The Mynydd Mawr Rehabilitation Unit was established at the hospital after to accommodate services transferred from Mynydd Mawr Hospital in October 2013. Following the closure of the accident and emergency department, a minor injuries unit opened at the hospital in 2016.

References

NHS hospitals in Wales
Hospitals in Carmarthenshire
Hospitals established in 1990
Hospital buildings completed in 1990
Hywel Dda University Health Board